The Andong Dam is an embankment dam on the Nakdong River,  east of Andong in Gyeongsangbuk-do province, South Korea. 

The purpose of the dam is flood control, water supply and hydroelectric power generation. Construction of the dam began in 1971 and was complete in 1976. The power plant is operated by the Korea Hydro and Nuclear Power (KHNP) organisation.

See also

List of power stations in South Korea

References

Dams completed in 1976
Energy infrastructure completed in 1976
Dams in South Korea
Hydroelectric power stations in South Korea
Rock-filled dams
Andong
Pumped-storage hydroelectric power stations in South Korea
Buildings and structures in North Gyeongsang Province
Flood control in South Korea